Lupon, officially the Municipality of Lupon, is a 1st class municipality in the province of Davao Oriental, Philippines. According to the 2020 census, it has a population of 66,979 people.

Lupon is said to have derived its name from the native word "naluponan", meaning a body of land accumulated at the mouth of a river resulting from years of continued accretion.  The settlers shortened the word "naluponan" into what is called now "Lupon". This "naluponan" area was then applied to the mouth of the Sumlug river of Lupon municipality of today.

Geography

Climate

Barangays
Lupon is politically subdivided into 21 barangays.

Demographics

Lupon, like many areas of Mindanao, is inhabited by the Mandaya, Mansaka, the native Kalagans, and the local immigrants from all points of the Visayas, Luzon and Mindanao. The immigrants brought with them their culture resulting in a mixture of beliefs and practices.

Economy

History
Lupon was primarily inhabited by the Mandaya and Mansaka in the hinterlands, and the native Kalagans in the shorelines of Lupon connected to Pantukan municipality and San Isidro municipality today. But, through a wave of migration [local immigrants from Luzon and the Visayas (Christians and Muslims alike)] and the coming of logging concessions, the population of Lupon has increased through the succeeding years.

The migrants from Luzon and Visayas took advantage of the natives' kindness and ignorance. They took their lands and were even proud to tell stories that the natives (Mandayas) changed their lands for sardines and tobacco.

The land grabbers and their descendants insult Mandayas on a daily basis. They treat them like they are lower life forms. They yell at them "Mandaya! Mandaya!" like being a Mandaya is a shameful thing. When a person behaves stupidly they will say "You are like a Mandaya." All of them does it including the educated ones.

Creation into a Municipal District

Lupon first became a regular barrio of Pantukan in 1919. Two years later Governor General Francis Burton Harrison issued an Executive Order No. 8, series of 1921, creating Lupon as a Municipal District comprising eight (8) barrios that include Poblacion Lupon, Sumlog, Cocornon, Tagugpo, Piso, Maputi, Langka, and Banaybanay.

For the meantime, Datu Commara Manuel was appointed as the municipal district president from 1921 to 1929. The American Occupation in the Philippine Islands was serious about pacifying inhabitants from rebellion against the American regime. What they did was to create Mindanao into a Moro Province, at the expense of the Christians both Catholic and Protestants also inhabiting the whole region. It was on this ground that Lupon was said to have been made into a sultanate with Datu Manuel as its sultan. But such an idea of Lupon becoming a sultanate was short-lived as Datu Manuel was replaced by the succeeding municipal district presidents.

These were the municipal district presidents after Datu Manuel: Alfredo Lindo (1929–1931); Luis Yabut (1931–1933); Teodoro Panuncialman (1933–1939); Carlos Badolato (1939 to the outbreak of World War II); Sixto Carreon (1940 onward to the Japanese Occupation); Cresencio Tuballa (1944–1945 time of the Philippine Commonwealth military and Recognized Guerrillas); Claudio Libre (1945–1946); Cresencio Tuballa (1946); and Carlos Badolato (1946–1947).

Creation into a regular municipality

Lupon was created into a regular municipality on August 8, 1948, by virtue of Executive Order No. 151, s. 1948 with Teodoro Panuncialman as the first appointed mayor of Lupon. But that appointment was cut short by another appointment of Crisanto Magno as mayor of Lupon from 1948 to 1950; however Panuncialman was re-appointed for 1950–1951.

At this time in 1951, a local election installed Crisanto Magno as the first elected mayor of Lupon from 1951 to 1955. Then the succeeding elected mayors were privileged to take responsibility of the unbroken mayoralty seat of Lupon. Oswaldo Barol (1955–67); Eulalio Angala Jr. (1967–79); Francisco M. dela Cruz (1979–86); then at the transition from the Marcos to the Aquino administration brought about by the February 1986 Edsa Revolution, Jose Lim was appointed Office In-Charge (1986–87); then Francisco dela Cruz was again re-elected and the longest reigning mayor(1988–98); Quiñones was elected in May (1998–2001); and Guiñez was elected in May 2001. But his untimely death brought the Vice Mayor Barabag to the mayoralty seat in 2002 to finish the term up until 2004. Quiñones was again elected to office during the 2004 elections and would serve the office until 2007. In 2007 Domingo Lim was first elected and served as mayor until 2016 after winning the 2010 and 2013 mayoralty elections respectively. He was replaced by this wife Erlinda Lim who won the 2016 election and became the first ever woman to serve as mayor of Lupon.

Mayors of Lupon
Here is the list of the Mayors of Lupon:

See also
Maryknoll School of Lupon
Eastern Davao Academy Inc.
Lupon National Comprehensive High School
Lupon Vocational High school

References

External links
 Lupon Profile at the DTI Cities and Municipalities Competitive Index
 [ Philippine Standard Geographic Code]
Philippine Census Information
Local Governance Performance Management System

Municipalities of Davao Oriental
Establishments by Philippine executive order